Benjamin Booker (born Benjamin Roderick Evans; June 14, 1989) is an American musician, singer, songwriter and guitarist. He cites The Gun Club, Blind Willie Johnson and T. Rex as influences.  His music was described by the Chicago Tribune as "a raw brand of blues/boogie/soul,", by The Independent as "frenzied guitar-strumming and raw, soulful vocals that are hair-raising in intensity" and by Spin as "bright, furious, explosive garage rock."

Early life 
Benjamin Booker was born in Virginia Beach, Virginia. His family relocated to Tampa, Florida, where he attended all-ages DIY punk shows as a teenager. He attended Orange Grove Middle School, a magnet school for the performing arts, followed by Hillsborough High School, where he studied in the International Baccalaureate Program. He then attended the University of Florida in Gainesville, studying journalism with intentions of going into music journalism. After college, he moved to New Orleans to work for a non-profit organization and began playing shows. He self-released the four-track EP Waiting Ones in 2012, a collection of "low-fi blues-influenced folk-punk recordings and handclap percussion" that gained the attention of music blog Aquarium Drunkard. The track "Have You Seen My Son" eventually landed on Sirius XM satellite radio. In 2013, he began touring as an electric duo and signed with ATO Records to produce his debut album.

Career

2013–2016: Benjamin Booker 
Booker's self-titled debut album was recorded in December 2013 at The Bomb Shelter, an analog studio in Nashville. Produced by Andrija Tokic (Alabama Shakes, Hurray for the Riff Raff), the album was released on August 19, 2014 via ATO Records in the United States and Rough Trade Records in Europe.  The first single from the album, "Violent Shiver," was released in April 2014. The album received early praise, debuting in the top 10 of Billboards Alternative Albums and Independent Albums charts and leading to Benjamin Booker being named an "artist you need to know" by Rolling Stone, "the best of what's next" by Paste and a "contender for rock record of the year" by Spin. Benjamin Booker also performed on late night television programs Late Night with David Letterman, Conan and Later With Jools Holland.

Since release, in addition to touring with Jack White and Courtney Barnett, Booker, accompanied by drummer Max Norton and bassist Alex Spoto, has played international headlining tours and performed at a number of festivals. In 2013, he performed at FYF Fest, the Newport Folk Festival, the Austin City Limits Music Festival, Voodoo Experience and Lollapalooza, where Rolling Stone named his performance the festival's "best rock star moment... best experienced live and turned up to 11". Internationally, he has appeared on the lineups of France's Festival Les InRocks Philips and Australia's St Jerome's Laneway Festival.

2017: Witness 

Booker's second album Witness was released on June 2, 2017. The album was announced with the premiere of its title track "Witness" (featuring Mavis Staples) alongside an essay written by Booker which detailed the experience that led him towards writing the album's title track. The song "Witness" was called "a piano-pounding hymn for Black Lives Matter" by The New York Times.  The title track's references to police brutality and activism garnered Booker coverage in politically-leaning outlets including Mic, which noted the album's "urgent synthesis of blues, gospel and soul — forms with long histories of translating black pain into uplifting and enduring compositions … with a raw and unforgiving candor that's reminiscent of downtown New York punk." The opening track "Right on You" was shared on April 19 by The Fader which called it "a staticky, high-tempo ballad that packs a punch". The third song to be released from the album, "Believe", was premiered by Time magazine on May 23. Since the album's release on June 2, 2017, WNYC has described Booker as "a punk & grit-infused songwriter whose ecstatic and soulful sounds channel vintage soul-rock, gospel, and blues." On June 19, "Witness" was shared by Pitchfork alongside a review saying Benjamin "makes retro music feel modern, reflecting on racism in America while drawing on blues, soul, and gospel."

Following the tours to support Witness, Booker was relatively quiet for the remainder of the decade. In September 2020, he released the single "Black Disco" with proceeds going to the Southern Poverty Law Center.

Discography

Studio albums 
 Benjamin Booker (2014)
 Witness (2017)

Live albums 
 Live at Third Man Records (2015 – exclusively on vinyl)

EPs 
 Waiting Ones (2012)
 Spotify Sessions (2014 – Digital exclusive via Spotify)

Singles 
 "Violent Shiver" (2014)
 "Witness" (2017)
"Black Disco" (2020)

References

External links 
 Benjamin Booker 
 Benjamin Booker at ATO Records 

1989 births
Living people
American rock guitarists
American male guitarists
Musicians from Virginia Beach, Virginia
ATO Records artists
African-American rock musicians
Guitarists from Virginia
21st-century American guitarists
21st-century American male musicians
Third Man Records artists
Rough Trade Records artists
African-American guitarists